One third of Tandridge District Council in Surrey, England is elected each year, followed by one year when there is an election to Surrey County Council instead. Since the last boundary changes in 2000, 42 councillors have been elected from 20 wards.

Political control
Since the first election to the council in 1973 political control of the council has been held by the following parties:

Leadership
The leaders of the council since 2007 have been:

Council elections
Summary of the council composition after recent council elections, click on the year for full details of each election. Boundary changes took place for the 2000 election, leading to the whole council being elected in that year.

1973 Tandridge District Council election
1976 Tandridge District Council election (New ward boundaries)
1979 Tandridge District Council election
1980 Tandridge District Council election
1982 Tandridge District Council election
1983 Tandridge District Council election
1984 Tandridge District Council election
1986 Tandridge District Council election
1987 Tandridge District Council election

2018 Tandridge District Council election
2019 Tandridge District Council election
2021 Tandridge District Council election
2022 Tandridge District Council election

District result maps

By-election results
By-elections occur when seats become vacant between council elections. Below is a summary of recent by-elections; full by-election results can be found by clicking on the by-election name.

References

External links
Tandridge District Council

 
Council elections in Surrey